Piotr Żemło (born 10 July 1995 in Giżycko) is a Polish professional footballer who plays as a centre back for Odra Opole. He is most known for being the lowest rated player (40) in EA's FIFA 15 tied with Paul Tisdale.

External links

References

1995 births
Living people
Association football defenders
Polish footballers
Poland youth international footballers
Ekstraklasa players
I liga players
II liga players
Wisła Kraków players
Wisła Puławy players
Odra Opole players